The 1981 U.S. National Indoor Championships was a men's tennis tournament played on indoor carpet courts that was part of the 1981 Volvo Grand Prix. It was the 11th edition of the tournament and was played at the Racquet Club of Memphis in Memphis, Tennessee in the United States from February 23 through March 1, 1981. Second-seeded Gene Mayer won the singles title and earned $36,000 first-prize money.

Finals

Singles
 Gene Mayer defeated  Roscoe Tanner 6–2, 6–4
 It was Mayer's 1st singles title of the year and the 8th of his career.

Doubles
 Gene Mayer /  Sandy Mayer defeated  Mike Cahill /  Tom Gullikson 7–6(7–3), 6–7(5–7), 7–6(7–5)

References

External links
 ITF tournament edition details

U.S. National Indoor
U.S. National Indoor Championships
Carpet court tennis tournaments
Indoor tennis tournaments
Tennis tournaments in the United States
U.S. National Indoor Tennis Championships
U.S. National Indoor Tennis Championships
U.S. National Indoor Tennis Championships